Albugo candida, commonly known as white rust, is a species of oomycete in the family Albuginaceae. It is sometimes called a fungus, but in fact forms part of a distinct lineage of fungus-like microorganisms, Oomycetes, commonly known as water moulds. A. candida is an obligate plant pathogen that infects Brassicaceae species and causes the disease known as white rust or white blister rust. It has a relatively smaller genome than other oomycetes.

Distribution
A. candida has a cosmopolitan distribution and is known from many countries where cruciferous crops are grown in Europe, Asia, Africa, Australasia, North, Central, and South America. It has not been recorded from northern Scandinavia, northern and central Siberia, northern China, western and central Africa, Alaska, northern and central Canada, and southern and western South America.

Hosts
This pathogen infects plants in the family Brassicaceae; the growth stages involved include the seedling stage, the growing stage, the flowering stage, and the fruiting stage. It has been recorded on almost all the varieties and species of the rapeseed-mustard group of crops as well as many wild brassicas. It has also been recorded on plants in the families Aizoaceae, Capparaceae, Cleomaceae, and Amaranthaceae. There are many different races and varieties of A. candida, each infecting its own group of species; for example, one infects Capsella, Arabis, and Lepidium, while another infects Brassica, Diplotaxis, and Sinapis. Certain races of A. candida can colonise the model plant species, Arabidopsis thaliana.

Symptoms
White rust can infect plants both locally and systemically. New pustules are borne in radial fashion, while older pustules coalesce to form a bigger pustules in the center. The systemic version causes distortion, abnormal growth forms, and sterile inflorescences. The abnormal growth forms are sometimes known as "stagheads". Infection with white rust predisposes a crop to develop downy mildew, caused by another oomycete plant pathogen Phytophthora nicotianae.

Life-cycle
When liberated, the sporangia inside the pustules are spread by wind, rain, and insects. After landing on a susceptible plant, each sporangium gives rise to about six zoospores which, under suitable conditions of moisture and light, form germ tubes which invade the plant's tissues. Zoospores are naked (wall-less), kidney-shaped and bi-flagellate. Both flagella are inserted laterally. Thick-walled sexual spores, called oospores are produced which germinate, producing either vesicles inside the plant tissue, exit tubes with vesicles at the tip, or germ tubes. Further zoospores develop inside the vesicles. The infection is spread by either oospore-infected seed or by mechanical movement of sporangia.

Genome
Several projects have produced draft assemblies of A. candida. The most recent one, using Pacific Biosciences sequencing technology, produced an genome assembly of 38.96 megabases, with 13,073 predicted genes. Amongst 1104 secreted proteins, 110 proteins belong to a class of effectors called "CCGs".

References

Further reading 

Water mould plant pathogens and diseases
Canola diseases
Albuginaceae